Syed Tariq Yaqoob Rizvi is a Pakistani politician who was a Member of the Provincial Assembly of the Punjab, from May 2013 to May 2018.

Early life and education
He was born on 1 December 1968 in Phalia.

He graduated in 1988 from Forman Christian College and has a degree of Bachelor of Arts.

Political career

He was elected to the Provincial Assembly of the Punjab as a candidate of Pakistan Muslim League (Nawaz) from Constituency PP-117 (Mandi Bahauddin-II) in 2013 Pakistani general election.

References

Living people
Punjab MPAs 2013–2018
1968 births
Pakistan Muslim League (N) politicians